Agicuphocera is a genus of flies in the family Tachinidae. It contains only one species, Agicuphocera nigra.

References

Further reading

External links

 

Tachinidae
Monotypic Brachycera genera
Taxa named by Charles Henry Tyler Townsend